The Accused is a 1988 American legal drama film directed by Jonathan Kaplan from a screenplay written by Tom Topor. The film is loosely based on the 1983 gang rape of  Cheryl Araujo in New Bedford, Massachusetts. Set in Washington state, but filmed mainly in Vancouver, British Columbia, the film stars Jodie Foster as Sarah Tobias, a young waitress, who is gang raped by three men at a local bar. With the aid of an attorney, Kathryn Murphy (Kelly McGillis), she sets out to prosecute the rapists as well as the men who helped induce the assault. Bernie Coulson, Leo Rossi, Ann Hearn, Carmen Argenziano, Steve Antin and Tom O'Brien are featured in supporting roles. 

The Accused premiered at the 39th Berlin International Film Festival, where it competed for the Golden Bear. It was released in limited theatres on October 14, 1988 by Paramount Pictures and was highly controversial upon release, mostly due to its graphic representation of gang rape. The film became a critical and commercial success, grossing over $92 million worldwide against a $13 million budget, and was chosen by the National Board of Review as the 3rd best film of the year. Critics praised the film's audacity, authentic portrayal of its subject matter, and credited it for being one of the first mainstream films to deal with the horrors of rape and its aftermath on a victim's life. Foster's performance marked her breakthrough into adult roles, earning numerous accolades including the Academy Award for Best Actress.

Plot
Sarah Tobias is brutally gang-raped by three men at a local bar while several patrons watch and cheer. District Attorney Katherine Murphy is assigned to the case. Although there is strong physical evidence corroborating Sarah's rape, Katherine feels that Sarah will not make a credible witness due to her checkered past and flirtatious behavior with the men prior to her attack. She agrees to a plea bargain, allowing the three rapists to plead guilty to the lesser offense of reckless endangerment, a felony without a sexual offense, and serve nine months in prison.

Sarah is angered and feels betrayed by Katherine's decision, as she wanted the chance to tell her story. Several months later, Sarah is harassed in a parking lot by one of the men who watched and encouraged her rape. In response, she drives her car into his truck, causing her to end up in the hospital. Katherine feels guilty for not giving Sarah the choice to take her case to trial and offering her rapists a plea deal. She decides to prosecute the men who clapped and cheered during Sarah's assault for criminal solicitation. If convicted, the rape will go on record, nullifying the plea deal, and her rapists will serve full prison terms of five years.

As the case goes to trial, Sarah is finally able to testify about what happened the night of her attack. Meanwhile, Katherine pores over evidence and comes across a tape of a 911 call in which a young man reports Sarah's rape. She discovers the caller is Kenneth Joyce, a college student who was present the night of the bar. Reluctant at first, he agrees to testify for the prosecution, recounting how the accused men cheered and goaded the rapists as they brutalized Sarah. The men are found guilty of criminal solicitation, and as a result, her rapists will serve additional time in prison. Sarah leaves the courtroom triumphant with Katherine.

Themes
It is loosely based on the 1983 gang rape of Cheryl Araujo in New Bedford, Massachusetts, and the resulting trial which received national coverage (and was also the focus of an episode on the 2020 Netflix documentary series Trial by Media). The film explores the themes of classism, misogyny, post-traumatic stress disorder, slut shaming, victim blaming and women's empowerment.

Cast

 Jodie Foster as Sarah Tobias
 Kelly McGillis as Assistant District Attorney Kathryn Murphy
 Bernie Coulson as Kenneth Joyce
 Leo Rossi as Cliff 'Scorpion' Albrect
 Ann Hearn as Sally Fraser
 Carmen Argenziano as Paul Rudolph
 Steve Antin as Bob Joiner
 Tom O'Brien as Larry
 Peter Van Norden as Paulsen
 Terry David Mulligan as Duncan
 Woody Brown as Danny
 Tom Heaton as Jesse
 Andrew Kavadas as Matt Haines
 Scott Paulin as Ben Wainwright
 Tom McBeath as Stu Holloway
 Kim Kondrashoff as Kurt
 Veena Sood as Woman Orderly

Production

Development

Screenwriter Tom Topor was inspired to write the film after the trial involving the rape of Cheryl Araujo became national news. Dawn Steel called him to ask if he'd be interested in doing a movie on the subject. Sherry Lansing and Stanley Jaffe from Paramount Pictures were subsequently signed on to produce the film. Topor interviewed 30 rape victims and numerous rapists, prosecutors, defense attorneys and medical professionals. Jonathan Kaplan met with Steel and discussed the possibility of making a film on the subject. The original draft of the script mainly focused on the lawyer's story. However, Kaplan wanted the rape victim to be as prominent as the lawyer; the script also featured a pool table (reflecting the real life incident), but the producers were concerned with being sued, so it was changed to a pinball machine.

Following the test screenings, the film received the lowest scores in the history of Paramount. According to Lansing, "The audience thought that Jodie's character deserved the rape." Studio executives wanted to put the film on the shelf and were looking for ways to prevent it from being released. Lansing asked for another screening with just women, which was far more successful. Of the 20 women in the room, 18 had experience with rape — either they or someone they knew had been raped. When tested again months later, it was given one of the highest scores in studio's history.

Casting
Due to its hardened themes and graphic screenplay, the studio was already skeptical of making the film and it was essential for the producers to cast a bankable actress in the role of Sarah Tobias. Numerous actresses were offered or considered for the part including Kim Basinger, Demi Moore, Jennifer Beals, Meg Tilly, Rosanna Arquette, and Kristin Davis, but all of them rejected the film due to its gruesome and controversial themes. Producers Sherry Lansing and Stanley R. Jaffe both had serious doubts about casting Foster because they did not think she could be sexual enough for the role of Sarah, also Foster who had recently graduated from Yale and didn't make any successful films during her time at school, wasn't the prime choice for the producers. Following numerous auditions as well as rejection from various established actresses, she was finally cast in the part.

Jane Fonda was initially attached to play attorney Kathryn Murphy but left the project as she found the script exploitative and poorly written. Ellen Barkin, Michelle Pfeiffer, Sigourney Weaver, Debra Winger, Meryl Streep and Geena Davis were also considered for the part. Kelly McGillis, who had just experienced commercial success with the action film Top Gun (1986), was cast for the bankable prospects of the film. McGillis was initially offered to play Sarah but declined, citing her personal experience. 
She acknowledged at the time of the film's release that she herself had survived a violent attack and rape in 1982 when two men broke into her apartment. Based on her experience, she took on the role of Murphy. Brad Pitt auditioned for the part of Ken Joyce.

Foster viewed the film as a last ditch effort to give her acting career a much needed boost. She had taken a sabbatical from Hollywood to attend Yale, which was prolonged due to John Hinckley's assassination attempt on President Ronald Reagan (which he carried out as a means to impress Foster with whom he had been obsessed after seeing her in Taxi Driver) in March 1981. After recovering from the media frenzy surrounding her following the incident, she had experienced a bit of a dry spell upon her return to acting. Most of her films had a lukewarm response both with critics and at the box office. She stated that she would have retired from acting had The Accused followed suit. Ultimately, the film's success revitalized her career.

Filming
Principal photography for The Accused began on April 22, 1987, and wrapped two months later on June 2. Although set in Washington state, it was filmed mainly in Vancouver, British Columbia. The gang rape scene was highly controversial at the time of its release (and still continues to be), as being the longest, most graphic and boldest representation of sexual assault in mainstream cinematic history. It took five days to complete and the filming was a difficult experience for the cast and crew involved. Everyone felt protective of Foster and worried how traumatic the situation could be for her. In an interview, Foster explained that the rape scene was meticulously rehearsed beforehand, so there would be no unpleasant surprises for anyone involved in the actual scene. She has stated that she does not remember filming the scene and completely blacked out and broke blood vessels in her right eye from crying during the shooting of the scene. The male actors were overwhelmingly upset. Leo Rossi (who played Cliff "Scorpion" Albrect, the bystander), recalled the experience of Woody Brown (who played Danny, one of the rapists) following the filming of the scene, in which he bolted from the set and threw up in his trailer. Complex ranked the rape scene from the film #16 on its list of "The 53 Most Hard-To-Watch Scenes in Movie History".

Soundtrack

Release
The Accused was released in limited theatres in North America on October 14, 1988. Although it was supposed to be released in April, it was deferred to October due to the Writers Guild of America's strike. The film premiered at the 39th Berlin International Film Festival in 1989, where it competed for the Golden Bear.

Reception

Box office
In its opening weekend in the United States and Canada, The Accused was number one at the box office, grossing $4.3 million in 796 theaters. The film grossed a total of $32.1 million in the United States and Canada and $60 million overseas for a worldwide total of $92.1 million.

Critical response

The Accused received positive reviews from critics upon its release, with Foster's performance receiving widespread acclaim. The review aggregator Rotten Tomatoes gives the film an approval rating of 92% based on 24 reviews, with an average rating of 7.1/10. On Metacritic, the film has an average score  of 65 out of 100 indicating "generally favourable reviews".

In a positive review, writing of the two criminal prosecutions in the film, Roger Ebert finds that the lesson of the trial "may be the most important message this movie has to offer...that verbal sexual harassment, whether crudely in a saloon back room or subtly in an everyday situation, is a form of violence - one that leaves no visible marks but can make its victims feel unable to move freely and casually in society. It is a form of imprisonment." Rob Beattie from Empire, gave the film five out of five stars, calling it phenomenal and called the controversial rape scene "devastating, harrowing and utterly convincing". Judy Steed of The Globe and Mail called it "An experience that is sometimes unbearable and always riveting". Vincent Canby of The New York Times called it "A consistently engrossing melodrama, modest in its aims and as effective for the clichés it avoids as for the clear eye through which it sees its working-class American lives".

Marjorie Heins, in the 1998 book The V-Chip Debate: Content Filtering from Television to the Internet, said that educators worried that the film would "receive V ratings and be subject to at least a presumption against curricular use in many public schools."

Accolades
At the 61st Academy Awards, Foster won Best Actress. This was the film's sole nomination, thus marking the first occurrence of such an event since 1962 (when Sophia Loren won for Two Women) that the winner of the category won for a film with a single nomination. In 2006, Foster's performance was ranked #56 on Premiere's 100 Greatest Film Performances of all-time.

Notes

References

Further reading
 Aquino, John T. (2005). "Big Dan's Tavern Rape Trial (1983) / Film: The Accused (1988)," in Truth and Lives on Film: The Legal Problems of Depicting Real Persons and Events in a Fictional Medium. McFarland. pp. 140–143. .

External links

 
 
 
 
 

1988 films
1988 crime drama films
1980s English-language films
1980s feminist films
1980s legal drama films
American courtroom films
American crime drama films
American feminist films
American legal drama films
Crime films based on actual events
Drama films based on actual events
Films about lawyers
Films about rape in the United States
Films about violence against women
Films directed by Jonathan Kaplan
Films featuring a Best Actress Academy Award-winning performance
Films featuring a Best Drama Actress Golden Globe-winning performance
Films scored by Brad Fiedel
Films set in 1987
Films set in Washington (state)
Films shot in Vancouver
Gang rape in fiction
Paramount Pictures films
1980s American films
Works about prosecutors